James Gleason is the name of:

 James Gleason (1882–1959), American actor, playwright and screenwriter
 James E. Gleason (1869–1964), American mechanical engineer, entrepreneur and inventor
 James P. Gleason (1921–2008), American politician
 James Gleason, head of the Chicago Police Department (1913–1915)
 James Gleason, former banjo player (2004–2006) with the American rock band Ceann
 James Gleason (born 1952), American actor who played Charlie Brown in the original 1975 production of Snoopy! The Musical
 James Gleason, American grocery business owner for whom the James Gleason Cottage was probably built in 1830

See also
 James Gleeson (1915–2008), Australian painter
 James Gleeson (bishop) (1920–2000), Australian Catholic Archbishop of Adelaide